Dunnet Parish Church is a Church of Scotland church in Dunnet, Caithness, northern Scotland. References to St Mary's Parish Church are known from as far back as the 13th century, and there are pre-16th century gravestones in the churchyard. It undoubtedly has pre-reformation origins, and the cartographer Timothy Pont was a notable minister here in 1610.

References

Churches in Highland (council area)
Category A listed buildings in Highland (council area)
Listed churches in Scotland
Buildings and structures in Caithness
13th century in Scotland
Church of Scotland churches in Scotland